Veerendra Patil was the Council of Ministers in Mysore, a state in South India headed by Veerendra Patil of the Indian National Congress.

The ministry had multiple  ministers including the Chief Minister of Mysore. All ministers belonged to the Indian National Congress (Organisation).

Veerendra Patil became Chief minister after incumbent Chief Minister of Mysore S. Nijalingappa moved to federal politics and became President of All India Congress Committee. Meanwhile, Nijalingappa chose Patil as his successor.

Chief Minister & Cabinet Ministers

Minister of State

See also 
 Mysore Legislative Assembly
 Mysore Legislative Council
 Politics of Mysore

References 

Cabinets established in 1968
1968 establishments in Mysore State
1971 disestablishments in India
Veerendra Patil
Indian National Congress (Organisation) state ministries
Cabinets disestablished in 1971
Indian National Congress (Organisation)
1968 in Indian politics